Events from the year 1889 in France.

Incumbents
President: Marie François Sadi Carnot 
President of the Council of Ministers: Charles Floquet (until 22 February), Pierre Tirard (starting 22 February)

Events
 January – Defense minister Georges Boulanger contemplates a coup but is forced to flee the country.
 4 February – The Tribunal Civil de la Seine orders the winding up of the Panama Canal Company.
 31 March – The Eiffel Tower is inaugurated.
 6 May – Exposition Universelle opens in Paris.
 28 May – Rubber tyre company Michelin is registered by Édouard and André Michelin.
 22 September – Legislative election held.
 6 October
 Legislative election held.
 Moulin Rouge built and opened in Paris.
 31 October – Exposition Universelle closes.
 The fashion house of Lanvin is established in Paris by Jeanne Lanvin.

Births

January to June
 20 January – Jean Odin, politician (died 1975)
 2 February – Jean de Lattre de Tassigny, general, military hero of World War II (died 1952)
 24 February – Suzanne Bianchetti, actress (died 1936)
 17 April – Marcel Boussac, entrepreneur and horse breeder (died 1980)
 17 May – Marcel Moyse, flautist (died 1984)
 24 May – Théophile Marie Brébant, military officer (died 1965)
 13 June – Alfred Janniot, sculptor (died 1969)

July to December
 5 July – Jean Cocteau, poet, novelist, dramatist, designer and filmmaker (died 1963)
 22/23 July – Georges Bonnet, politician (died 1973)
 7 August
 Georges Thierry d'Argenlieu, Admiral (died 1964)
 Léon Brillouin, physicist (died 1969)
 15 August – Marthe Richard, prostitute, spy and politician (died 1982)
 20 October – Suzanne Duchamp, painter (died 1963)
 25 October – Abel Gance, film director, producer, writer, actor and editor (died 1981)
 6 November – Gabriel Hanot, soccer player and journalist (died 1968)
 26 November – Albert Dieudonné, actor, screenwriter, film director and novelist (died 1976)
 5 December – Marie-Louise Damien, singer and actress (died 1978)
 7 December – Gabriel Marcel, philosopher (died 1973)
 17 December – Antoine Béthouart, General (died 1982)

Deaths
 23 January – Alexandre Cabanel, painter (born 1823)
 16 March – Edmond Henri Adolphe Schérer, theologian, critic and politician (born 1815)
 9 April – Jean-Baptiste Arban, cornetist and conductor (born 1825)
 20 April – Charles Friedel, chemist and mineralogist (born 1832) 
 23 April – Jules Amédée Barbey d'Aurevilly, novelist and short story writer (born 1808)
24 April - Zulma Carraud, children's author (born 1796)
 10 July – Joseph Projectus Machebeuf, French-American Catholic missionary and the first Bishop of Denver (born 1812)
 19 August – Auguste Villiers de l'Isle-Adam, writer (born 1838)
 29 September – Louis Faidherbe, general and colonial administrator (born 1818)
 22 October – Philippe Ricord, physician (born 1800)
 25 October – Émile Augier, dramatist (born 1820)
 14 December – Jean Baptiste Lucien Buquet, entomologist (born 1807)
 31 December – Ernest Cosson, botanist (born 1819)

References

External links 

 Timeline for Events in France

1880s in France